{{Infobox musical artist 
| name             = Eddie Johns 
| image            = Eddie_Johns_-_Paris_Metro_album_cover_1980.jpeg
| caption          = Johns surrounded by female background vocalists, Paris Metro album cover
| background       = solo_singer
| birth_name       = Foda Eddie Johns
| alias            = 
| birth_date       = 
| birth_place      = Liberia
| death_date       = 
| death_place      = 
| origin           = 
| instrument       = 
| genre            = Disco · soul · funk · rock · soft rock ·
| occupation       = Singer, songwriter
| years_active     = 
| label            = President, GM Musipro
| associated_acts  = 
| website          = 
}}Eddie Johns' is a retired Liberian musician who experienced limited success in the music industry as a singer songwriter in the disco, funk, soul, rock and soft rock genres. Sytonia Reid stated in The Grio that Johns "did not find mainstream success" during his career. He is best known for playing an important indirect role in the creation of the very popular Daft Punk song One More Time. In an article in The Root, Staff Writer Tonja Renée Stidhum stated that Johns "produced a track in 1979, from which Daft Punk’s hit single was sampled."

 Early life 

Johns was born in 1951 in Liberia. His father was an accountant and his mother was a nurse. Altogether, they had eight children. In an article in the Los Angeles Times, Johns stated that his mother "was always singing or humming while doing housework." Staff writer August Brown stated in that same article that Johns, too, "discovered he had a gift for singing." He "fell in love with American rock and soul artists like Aretha Franklin, Johnnie Taylor, Jimi Hendrix and Eddie Floyd." Brown added that Johns "moved to Paris in 1977 to make records" and "sometimes struggled to earn money, and experienced bouts of homelessness there."

 Career 

Johns recorded two albums while living in Paris, More Spell on You and Paris Metro. He also recorded a few singles and EPs. When his musical career in Europe slowed down, he moved to the United States, first to New York and later to California where he currently resides.

 One More Time One More Time is a song by the French electronic music duo Daft Punk. It was named one of the greatest songs of the decade by Pitchfork, and Rolling Stone named it one of "The 500 Greatest Songs of All Time". Mixmag readers voted it the greatest dance record of all time.One More Time contains a sample of the 1979 disco song "More Spell on You" by Johns, which is uncredited in the Discovery liner notes. An article in Boing Boing stated that "Daft Punk chopped and flipped a disco sample to create One More Time."

Johns, who has been destitute for decades, did not receive royalties for the sample. A representative for Daft Punk confirmed the use of the sample and that the duo continued to pay royalties to GM Musipro, the French publishing company that owned the rights to "More Spell on You". A representative of GM Musipro said they had never been able to locate Johns, and that they would follow up on the matter after an investigation by the Los Angeles Times'' in 2021. Music industry attorney Erin Jacobson stated during that investigation that "smaller artists are more vulnerable to infringements, but it’s a common problem that the rights owner can’t be found, or the record company has gone out of business, or it’s unclear who owns the rights." The substantial royalties available for a musician like Johns could make all the difference in the world regarding his quality of life. As for how much those royalties could be, Jacobson estimated that "a song with that amount of streams would be earning in the high six-to-seven-figure range on streams alone."

References

External links 

 Discography at Discogs

Liberian people
Liberian male musicians
Dance musicians
Disco musicians
Living people
Year of birth missing (living people)